|}

The Royal Whip Stakes is a Group 3 flat horse race in Ireland open to thoroughbreds aged three years or older. It is run over a distance of 1 mile and 2 furlongs (2,012 metres) at the Curragh in August.

History
The event was established in 1821, and it was originally a long-distance race for horses aged four or older. It was named after its trophy, a gold-handled whip presented to the Irish Turf Club by King George IV. It was initially one of a series of races known as the Royal Plates.

The trophy was replaced by a new whip provided by King William IV in 1830. The event was opened to three-year-olds in 1832. It was limited to Irish-bred horses for a period after the 1860s.

The Royal Whip Stakes was cut to 2½ miles in 1925, and to 2 miles in 1936. Its original prize fund of 100 guineas remained unchanged until 1954. From this point it was contested over 1½ miles.

The race was given Group 3 status in the early 1970s. It was shortened to 1¼ miles in 1995, and promoted to Group 2 level in 1998. It was relegated back to Group 3 in 2013.

Records
Most successful horse (3 wins):
 Roller – 1822, 1824, 1825
 Skylark – 1830, 1831, 1832

Leading jockey since 1950 (7 wins):
 Michael Kinane – Kamakura (1985), Beyond the Lake (1989), Rayseka (1993), King Alex (1997), Make No Mistake (1998), Bach (2001), High Chaparral (2003)

Leading trainer since 1950 (13 wins):
 Vincent O'Brien – Ross Sea (1959), Bally Joy (1965), Reindeer (1970), Tantoul (1971), Manitoulin (1972), Cavo Doro (1973), Alleged (1977, 1978), Last Light (1981), Lords (1982), Empire Glory (1984), Baba Karam (1987), Splash of Colour (1990)

Winners since 1977

Earlier winners

 1821: Langar
 1822: Roller
 1823: Langar
 1824: Roller
 1825: Roller
 1826: Miss Foote
 1827: Balderdash
 1828: Paddy Whack
 1829: Napoleon
 1830: Skylark
 1831: Skylark
 1832: Skylark
 1833: Napoleon
 1834: Thump
 1835: Rust
 1836: Exchange
 1837: Harkaway
 1838: Cregane
 1839: Retriever
 1840: St Lawrence
 1841: Great Wonder
 1842: Bangor
 1843: Fairy Queen
 1844: King Dan
 1845: The Switcher
 1846: Burgundy
 1847: Rat Trap
 1848: Dough
 1849: The Baroness
 1850: Marchioness d'Eu
 1851: Kick Up the Dust
 1852: Chaseaway
 1853: Chaseaway
 1854: Doctor O'Toole
 1855: The Chicken
 1856: The Chicken
 1857: The Tattler
 1858: Agitation
 1859: Hibernia
 1860: Shamrock
 1861: The Lawyer
 1862: Castle Hackett
 1863: Tourist
 1864: Woodman
 1865: Lord Conyngham
 1866: Dunsany
 1867: Columbus
 1868: Aneroid
 1869: The Scout
 1870: Finesse
 1871: Trieste
 1872: Speculation
 1873: Bedouin
 1874: Christmas
 1875: Ingomar
 1876: Fair Alice
 1877: Piersfield
 1878: Matilda
 1879: Sisyphus
 1880: Miriam
 1881: Miriam
 1882: Buckshot
 1883: Peace
 1884: Xema
 1885: Sylvan Queen
 1886: Sylvan Queen
 1887: Campanula
 1888: Little John
 1889: Little John
 1890: Golden Crescent
 1891: Chatterbox
 1892: Red Prince
 1893: Golden Ring
 1894: Starlight
 1895: The Jew
 1896: Aline
 1897: Gustaloga
 1898: The Falloch
 1899: Lillian Noel
 1900: The Falloch
 1901: Glenmalur
 1902: Driftwood
 1903: Sylvan Park
 1904: Sylvan Park
 1905: Claret Lass
 1906: Claret Lass
 1907: Mrs Lyons
 1908: Bouncing Bess
 1909: Octocide
 1910: Lorello
 1911: Castle Jewel
 1912: Master of Light
 1913: Laoghaire
 1914: Bachelor's Fiasco
 1915: Garrus
 1916: Scarlet Rambler
 1917: Noham
 1918: King Frusquin
 1919: Earn's Glen
 1920: Red Flag
 1921: Coup d'Essai
 1922: Carthage
 1923: Mullagher-a-Boo
 1924: Blue Fish
 1925: Jillsome
 1926: Philanderer
 1927: Lomond's Lake
 1928: Tan Girl
 1929: Swift Agnes
 1930: Nice Token
 1931: Sahabelle
 1932: Cloverdale
 1933: Song of the Hills
 1934: Theorosa
 1935: Sol Erin
 1936: Harvest Star
 1937: Kildonan's Hope
 1938: Corofin
 1939: Dennison
 1940: Antrim
 1941: Etoile de Lyons
 1942: Anniversary
 1943: Blue Speck
 1944: Rhodes
 1945: Golden Spur
 1946: Spring Offensive
 1947: Lorimer
 1948: Signal Service
 1949: Eastern Gem
 1950: L'Horizon
 1951: Storm Beacon
 1952: Beau Sire
 1953: Sunny Streak
 1954: Hidalgo
 1955: Zarathustra
 1956: Jongleur
 1957: Solartickle
 1958: Irish Penny
 1959: Ross Sea
 1960: Avril Sprite
 1961: Azurine
 1962: Gay Challenger
 1963: Nos Royalistes
 1964: Cassim
 1965: Bally Joy
 1966: Wedding Present
 1967: Vendor
 1968: Stitch
 1969: Candy Cane
 1970: Reindeer
 1971: Tantoul
 1972: Manitoulin
 1973: Cavo Doro
 1974: Klairvimy
 1975: Consol
 1976: Yankee Gold

See also
 Horse racing in Ireland
 List of Irish flat horse races

References

 Paris-Turf: 
 Racing Post:

 galopp-sieger.de – Royal Whip Stakes.
 ifhaonline.org – International Federation of Horseracing Authorities – Royal Whip Stakes (2019).
 irishracinggreats.com – Royal Whip Stakes.
 pedigreequery.com – Royal Whip Stakes – Curragh.
 tbheritage.com – Royal Whip Stakes.

Open middle distance horse races
Curragh Racecourse
Flat races in Ireland
Recurring sporting events established in 1821
1821 establishments in Ireland